Sayla city is headquarter of Sayla Taluka of Surendranagar district, Gujarat, India, with total 3142 families residing. The Sayla city has population of 16169 of which 8,370 are males while 7,799 are females as per Population Census 2011.

In Sayla city population of children with age 0-6 is 2077 which makes up 12.85% of total population of the city. Average Sex Ratio of Sayla city is 932 which is higher than Gujarat state average of 919. Child Sex Ratio for the Sayla as per census is 835, lower than Gujarat average of 890.

Sayla has lower literacy rate compared to Gujarat. In 2011, literacy rate of Sayla was 73.12% compared to 78.03% of Gujarat. In Sayla, male literacy stands at 82.27% while female literacy rate was 63.45%.

Sayla is called 'Bhagat-no-Gaum', or the village of the pilgrims, because of its famous Hindu and Jain Temples and spiritual centres. Sayla is the head quarter of world famous spiritual organisation, Shree Raj Saubhag Ashram. Lalji Maharaj ni Jagya is another well known spiritual centre.

Darbargadh, the historic palace is still occupied by the Sayla ruling family.

The Old Bell Guest House in Sayla is said to have been the British Residency and European Guesthouse of Sayla princely state.

See also 
 Sayla Taluka
 Chotila
 Juna Jashapar

References 

 http://www.rajsaubhag.org/ashram

Villages in Surendranagar district